Rob Greenhalgh (born 17 August 1977) is a British sailor who has competed in and won both the Volvo Ocean Race and the Extreme Sailing Series.

Greenhalgh has participated in the Volvo Ocean Race aboard ABN Amro I in the 2005–06 Volvo Ocean Race, Puma for Puma Ocean Racing Team in the 2008–09 Volvo Ocean Race, Azzam for Abu Dhabi Ocean Racing in the 2011–12 Volvo Ocean Race and on Maprfe in the 2014–15 Volvo Ocean Race.

He has also participated in the Extreme Sailing Series, winning it in 2007 (when it was known as the iShares Cup) and as Skipper of Team Duqm Oman in 2013, and in 2014 of Oman Air.

Results
2016 - Moth World Championship - 3rd
2013 - UK Moth National Championships - 1 st
2011–12 - Volvo Ocean Race - Abu Dhabi Ocean Racing – 5 th 
2008–09 - Volvo Ocean Race - PUMA – 2nd  
2007 - America’s Cup - TEAMORIGIN
2007 - Extreme Sailing Series - 1st
2007 - Cowes Week, Class one – 1st
2005–06 - Volvo Ocean Race - ABN AMRO ONE – 1st  
2004 - 18ft Skiff JJ Giltinan International Trophy – 1st
2004 – 18 ft Skiff European Championship – 1st
2004 – 18 ft Skiff National Championship – 1st
2003 - International 14 World Championship – 1st
2003 – 18 ft Skiff National Championship – 1st
2003 - Rolex Fastnet, Class Zero - 1st
2003 - 18ft Skiff JJ Giltinan International Trophy – 2nd

References

External links 
 

1977 births
Living people
English male sailors (sport)
49er class sailors
Moth class sailors
Extreme Sailing Series sailors
Volvo Ocean Race sailors
Moth class world champions
International 14 world champions
World champions in sailing for Great Britain